Ed Smith   was a Major League Baseball pitcher. He played for the Baltimore Monumentals of the Union Association in the  season.

External links
Baseball-Reference.com page

Baltimore Monumentals players
Major League Baseball pitchers
19th-century baseball players
Date of death missing
Date of birth missing
Year of birth missing
Year of death missing